The 2010–11 Slovenian First League of Handball season.

Teams information

Regular season

Standings

Pld - Played; W - Won; L - Lost; PF - Points for; PA - Points against; Diff - Difference; Pts - Points.

Championship play-offs

Standings

Pld - Played; W - Won; L - Lost; PF - Points for; PA - Points against; Diff - Difference; Pts - Points.

Relegation round

Pld - Played; W - Won; L - Lost; PF - Points for; PA - Points against; Diff - Difference; Pts - Points.

References

External links
Scoresway

Handball competitions in Slovenia
2010–11 domestic handball leagues
2010 in Slovenian sport
2011 in Slovenian sport